Zsófia Tóth (born 25 December 1989 in Tata), also Zsófi, is a Hungarian professional triathlete, several times National Champion in various categories, number 2 in the national elite Ranglista and the 2011 National Vice Champion. Since 2005 she has been a permanent member of the National Team. In the 2010 ITU ranking (Women’s Standings) she was number 20 of the 81 best U23 triathletes of the world.

Education 
Zsófia Tóth attended the Váci Mihály Általános Iskola and the high school Középiskola Bárdos László Gimnázium in Tatabánya, which she finished in 2009.
Then she moved to Vienna, where she lived together with the Austrian Hungarian triathlete Christian Wohlmutter and studied sports at the University of Vienna.

Sports career 
Since 2003 Zsófia Tóth has been supported by the Hungarian Herkulesz sports promotion scheme and by the Hungarian company group MOL and its foundation Új Europaal Aapítvány.
Tóth's coach is Licskó Csaba.

Until 2008, Tóth represented the club ORTRI situated in Oroszlány, not far from her hometown Tata.
In 2009, Tóth joined the small Kropkó Triatlon Club, directed by the Hungarian triathlete and several times ironman winner Péter Kropkó.
From 2010 onwards, Toth has represented to TVK Mali Triatlon Klub located in Tiszaújváros.

In 2011, Tóth also took part in the prestigious French Club Championship Series Lyonnaise des Eaux. At the Grand Final in La Baule (17 September 2011), she placed 26th in the individual ranking and her club TOCC (Tri Olympique Club Cessonais) placed 7th.

ITU Competitions 
In the six years from 2005 to 2010, Zsófia Tóth took part in 34 ITU competitions and achieved 17 top ten positions.
For the World Cup in Huatulco Tóth was appointed a member of the Team ITU.

The following list is based upon the official ITU rankings and the athlete's Profile Page. Unless indicated otherwise all events are triathlons (Olympic Distance) and belong to the Elite category.

BG = the sponsor British Gas · DNF = did not finish · DNS = did not start

External links
 Tóth's club TVK Mali in Hungarian
 Heraklesz promotion scheme: Toth's Profile Page in Hungarian
 Hungarian Triathlon Federation in Hungarian

Notes

1989 births
Living people
People from Tata, Hungary
Hungarian female triathletes
Sportspeople from Komárom-Esztergom County